Ricci Paolo Uy Rivero (born May 25, 1998) is a Filipino basketball player. Rivero played for the De La Salle Green Archers in his first two years in collegiate basketball. His breakout performance in the UAAP Season 80 men's basketball tournament earned him a spot in the Mythical Five and the Most Improved Player award.

In April 2018, Rivero announced that he has left the De La Salle Green Archers to focus on Gilas Pilipinas. In May 2018, it was revealed that Rivero has transferred to be part of the University of the Philippines Fighting Maroons. Rivero suited up in UP starting season 82 of the UAAP.

He is also an actor who first featured in the MMFF film Otlum.

Early life and high school career 
Born and raised in Ilagan, Isabela Province, Rivero moved to Manila to complete his secondary education at La Salle Green Hills in Mandaluyong. In his final year of high school, he averaged 25.4 points, 8.8 rebounds, 2.8 assists, 2.4 steals, and 1.9 blocks in the elimination round for the Greenies, but lost to the Arellano Braves in the first round of the playoffs. In 2016, Rivero joined the De La Salle Green Archers.

College career

De La Salle Green Archers 
In his rookie season, the Archers won the championship.

In his sophomore season, Rivero averaged 14.1 points, 5.4 rebounds, 1.9 assists, and 1.7 steals. He led the Archers to the Finals, and earned Mythical Team Honors. He also won the Most Improved Player award. However, in January 2018, he was cut from the squad along with older brother Prince and reserve Brent Paraiso. The school said his suspension from the team was due to his endorsement deals, which is in conflict with a team rule. Later, in April, he announced on Twitter that he would exit the team.

UP Fighting Maroons 
In May 2018, Rivero announced on Twitter that he would be joining the UP Fighting Maroons. He redshirted Season 81 due to UAAP's eligibility rules.

In Season 82, the Maroons made it to the semifinals where they lost to the UST Growling Tigers.

He played for UP in Season 84, despite getting offers to play overseas in Japan. They won the championship that season.

Professional career
On June 24, 2022, Rivero signed with the Taoyuan Pilots of the P. League+. However, he was released before the season started.

On February 15, 2023, Rivero signed a short-term deal with the Blackwater Bossing Red President of the PBA 3x3.

National team career 
Rivero first played for the Philippine national team in 2013, when the U16 team swept the SEABA Championships. He was considered for the "23 for 23" pool, a pool of Gilas Cadets for the 2023 FIBA World Cup. However, La Salle requested coach Chot Reyes to not include him in the lineup. He also practiced with the senior team during the 2019 FIBA World Cup qualifiers.

Rivero played in the 2015 U18 3x3 World Championship and in the 2018 U23 3x3 World Cup. He also joined the Philippines team for the 2019 3x3 Asia Cup, but hurt his ankle in their opener against Thailand.

Off the court

Film and TV 
In 2016, he participated in the finale of Nike Rise Philippines, a reality documentary basketball development program aired on TV5. He went up against Nike's final team along with other UAAP, NCAA and Perlas Pilipinas players.

In 2018, he starred in his first film, Otlum.

In 2020, Rivero became a permanent host of Brightlight Productions' Sunday Noontime Live!, which is aired on TV5 via a blocktime agreement. When that show closed, he announced that he would take a break from acting to focus on his studies and basketball.

Endorsements 
Rivero is a very popular athlete, as he was named the "Most Tweeted and Most Talked-About Filipino Athlete" by Twitter Philippines. He is an endorser for numerous companies such as Honda, Globe, Gatorade, Nike, and many more.

In 2021, he appeared in a Pepsi ad that was shown in Times Square, N.Y.C.

Filmography

Television

Film

Personal life
As of April 9, 2022, Rivero is officially in a relationship with actress Andrea Brillantes.

Before the start of UAAP Season 84, he pledged ₱250 to the UP Ikot Drivers Association who had been hit hard by the pandemic, for every point he scored. He was able to raise ₱154,200, and other supporters rounded out the donations to a total of ₱200,000.

References

External links 
 

1998 births
Living people
Basketball players from Isabela (province)
De La Salle Green Archers basketball players
Filipino male film actors
Filipino male television actors
Filipino men's 3x3 basketball players
Filipino men's basketball players
PBA 3x3 players
Small forwards
Shooting guards
UP Fighting Maroons basketball players